Hewitt Glacier is a glacier,  long, descending the eastern slopes of the Holland Range, Antarctica, between Lewis Ridge and Mount Tripp to enter Richards Inlet. It was named by the New Zealand Geological Survey Antarctic Expedition (1959–60) for Leonard R. Hewitt, leader at Scott Base, 1959.

References

Glaciers of Shackleton Coast